Vernon Elmer Wagner (June 13, 1926 - May 31, 2016), was an American politician who was a member of the North Dakota House of Representatives. He represented the 32nd district from 1963 to 1983 as a member of the Republican party. He also served as Speaker of the House in 1979. He was an alumnus of North Dakota State University where he obtained a Bachelor of Science degree in pharmacy.

References

1926 births
2016 deaths
North Dakota State University alumni
Speakers of the North Dakota House of Representatives
Republican Party members of the North Dakota House of Representatives
People from Golden Valley County, North Dakota
1996 United States presidential electors